"Dude (Looks Like a Lady)" is a song by American rock band Aerosmith.  It was released as the lead single from the band's ninth studio album Permanent Vacation in 1987. 

The track reached number 14 on the Billboard Hot 100, number 41 on the Hot Dance Club Play chart, number four on the Mainstream Rock Tracks chart, number 22 on the Canadian RPM Top Singles chart and number 45 on the UK Singles Chart. It was re-released in early 1990 and peaked at number 20 in the UK. It was certified Silver in the UK for selling over 200,000 copies.

The song was written by lead singer Steven Tyler, lead guitarist Joe Perry and songwriter Desmond Child.

Origins
The song, which originally started out as "Cruisin' for a Lady", talks about a man with an effeminate appearance, who is mistaken for a woman. Steven Tyler states in the book Walk This Way: The Autobiography of Aerosmith: "One day we met Mötley Crüe, and they're all going, 'Dude!' Dude this and Dude that, everything was Dude. 'Dude (Looks Like a Lady)' came out of that session."

According to Child, Tyler came up with the idea of the song while at a bar and mistaking Mötley Crüe's lead singer Vince Neil for a woman with long blonde hair. Tyler's bandmates made fun of him, joking about how the “dude looked like a lady.” Mötley Crüe's Nikki Sixx, in his book, The Heroin Diaries, states that the song was inspired by Neil.

Joe Perry came up with the chorus riff, and Tyler came up with the chorus refrain. Tyler originally sang the hook as "cruisin' for the ladies", but Child lambasted the lyrical idea, stating that "I don't think Van Halen would put that on the B-side of their worst record."  Child stated that the band had originally wanted to use the lyric " ‘Cruisin’ for the Ladies" instead of "Dude Looks Like a Lady" for fear that the latter would offend the gay community but Child told him that "‘I’m gay. It’s not offensive. It’s great." and convinced the band to use those lyrics.

Controversy 

Despite the song's mainstream success, "Dude (Looks Like a Lady)" has often been accused of being transphobic, with "its lyrics and music video’s offensive insinuations about trans women." In a 2012 interview, Child said about the song, "I talked Aerosmith into the whole scenario of a guy that walks into a strip joint and falls in love with the stripper on stage, goes backstage and finds out it's a guy." In 2019, Child confirmed that the song was about a man who "just walks into a bar and sees this gorgeous blonde up on the stage and then goes backstage after the show and then she 'whips out a gun, tries to blow me away.'"

Perry was concerned that the subject matter of the song would offend the gay community, but Child said, "Okay, I'm gay, and I'm not insulted. Let's write this song."

Vox's Abbey White pointed out that "the song also plays on the idea that trans women intentionally deceive men or are 'in disguise', that they are unattractive or repulsive... and at one point mixes pronouns, going from 'Oh she like it' in one line to 'Oh, he was a lady,' in the next."

Child has refuted all allegations of transphobia, describing the song as "accepting" because of the lyric "never judge a book by its cover, or who you're going to love by your lover."

On August 27, 2013, Fox News played this song while introducing Chelsea Manning. As well as the network's use of masculine pronouns and Manning's deadname, playing this song received backlash by commentators.

After Caitlyn Jenner called "Dude (Looks Like a Lady)" her "theme song" in 2017, backlash ensued from fans and from LGBT activists due to the perceived transphobia.

Reception
Cash Box said that  it has "humorous lyrics coupled with a driving rock beat."

Music video
The video for "Dude (Looks Like a Lady)" features the band performing live onstage as well as random moments of characters portraying drag queens, including a cameo appearance by A&R man John Kalodner dressed up in a wedding dress at one point. This is a joke based on the fact that Kalodner always dresses in white.  Joe Perry's wife Billie also appears in the music video, pretending to play the saxophone on stage.

There are also some provocative sexual performances, both led by singer Steven Tyler as well as a presumed female who has her skirt torn off to reveal the Aerosmith "wings" tattoo on her buttocks. The video was directed by Marty Callner.

Award nominations
"Dude" picked up two MTV Video Music Award nominations in 1988 (the first for the band).  It was nominated for Best Group Video and Best Stage Performance, but failed to gain the wins.  The band made up for it eventually, winning over 10 "moon-men" and 4 Grammys in the 1990s.

Credits and personnel 

 Steven Tyler – lead vocals
 Joe Perry – lead guitar, backing vocals
 Brad Whitford – rhythm guitar
 Tom Hamilton – bass guitar
 Joey Kramer – drums

Additional personnel 

 Tom Keenlyside – clarinet, tenor saxophone, horn arrangement
 Ian Putz – baritone saxophone
 Bob Rogers – trombone
 Henry Christian – trumpet
 Bruce Fairbairn – trumpet, background vocals

Charts and certifications

Weekly charts

Certifications

Legacy
The song has long been a staple on both rock radio and in concert, as the band has regularly rotated it into their set lists over the years.

The song has been featured on a number of subsequent compilation albums by Aerosmith including 1994's Big Ones, 2002's O, Yeah! Ultimate Aerosmith Hits,  2006's Devil's Got a New Disguise: The Very Best of Aerosmith, and the 1998 live album, A Little South of Sanity.

Concurrent with its chart run, the song was played in the 1987 comedy film Like Father Like Son, starring Kirk Cameron and Dudley Moore.

Professional wrestler Roddy Piper appeared as a guest VJ on MTV shortly after the song's release.  During one segment, the song's video was played, followed by a Michael Jackson video.  Piper appeared afterward, repeatedly chanting "Dude looks like a lady!" in the manic fashion of a wrestling interview, intended more as a jab at Jackson than any reference to Aerosmith or the song.

In 1993, the song was prominently featured in the film Mrs. Doubtfire, during a montage of the main character bonding with his family in disguise as a woman.  The song was also used in the film's TV ads.  Randi Mayem Singer, the writer of Mrs. Doubtfire, credits "Dude (Looks Like a Lady)" as one of the most important songs ever written and as the direct influence for writing the script. She was quoted as saying "Without ['Dude (Looks Like a Lady)'], there would be no Mrs. Doubtfire".

The song was also featured in the movie It's Pat where the title character (played by Julia Sweeney) sings a karaoke version at their wedding reception. The song fits in with the running joke throughout the film, in reference to Pat's gender ambiguity.

The song was performed live by the band in the movie, Wayne's World 2, and is featured on the soundtrack for the film.

In "There's Something About Marrying" the tenth episode of the sixteenth season sixteenth season of the American animated television series The Simpsons, Veronica is singing the song while shaving as Marge accidentally discovers him as a man cross-dressed as a woman who is about to marry her sister Patty.

The video for "Dude (Looks Like a Lady)" is featured on the karaoke game SingStar Vol. 2 for PlayStation 3.

Colombian singer-songwriter Shakira sang the song with Steven Tyler on MTV Icon and also included it on the set list of her Tour of the Mongoose.

The song is played as one of the possible song choices on Rock 'n' Roller Coaster at Disney's Hollywood Studios.

The song is featured in the MTV animated series, Station Zero where DJ Tech played on his turntables.

See also
List of glam metal albums and songs

References

External links
 [ 'Dude (Looks Like A Lady)' review on Allmusic.com]

Aerosmith songs
1987 singles
Songs written by Desmond Child
Music videos directed by Marty Callner
Songs written by Steven Tyler
Songs written by Joe Perry (musician)
Song recordings produced by Bruce Fairbairn
Geffen Records singles
1987 songs
Glam metal songs
LGBT-related songs
LGBT-related controversies in music